The Fort Hays Limestone is a member of the Niobrara Formation of the Colorado Group exposed in Colorado, Kansas, Nebraska, and South Dakota and is named for the bluffs near the old Fort Hays, a well-known landmark in western Kansas.

Defining the southeast border of the High Plains, the towering stone-capped bluffs of the Fort Hays Escarpment are "perhaps the most conspicuous physiographic boundary in Kansas." 

The Fort Hays Limestone was a generally practical building stone. However, it deteriorates when in contact with soil (note the repaired foundation on the Old Fort Hays Blockhouse). In contrast, the Fencepost limestone is quite durable in the ground, so, the Fencepost can be seen in foundation course of buildings that are otherwise faced with Fort Hays Limestone.  Particularly in Hays and Ellis, where the Fort Hays and Fencepost outcrops are in close geographic proximity, the two limestones are seen in combination in buildings.

See also

 List of fossiliferous stratigraphic units in Colorado
 List of fossiliferous stratigraphic units in Kansas
 List of fossiliferous stratigraphic units in Nebraska
 Paleontology in Colorado
 Paleontology in Kansas
 Paleontology in Nebraska

References

Cretaceous Colorado
Cretaceous Kansas
Cretaceous Nebraska